Stilapex cookeanus is a species of sea snail, a marine gastropod mollusk in the family Eulimidae.

References

Eulimidae
Gastropods described in 1917